Bessels Green is a village now incorporated into the built-up area of Sevenoaks in Kent, England.  It is on the north-western outskirts of Sevenoaks, in the parish of Chevening. At the 2011 Census the village population was included in the civil parish of Sundridge with Ide Hill.  The busy trunk route of the A25 runs through the centre of the village.

Bessels Green has a village green and one public house, the King's Head. The brightly coloured painted cottages on the eastern side of the green form a colourful backdrop to traffic passing through the village on the busy A25 and are part of some of the iconic street and country scenes of the Sevenoaks area.  There are two churches; the Bessels Green Unitarian Meeting House (built 1716) and the Bessels Green Baptist Church (c. 1771). There is easy accessibility to 3 primary schools, Chevening C.E.P Primary school, Riverhead Infants School and Amherst Junior School.

External links

 Chevening Parish Council website
Chevening News
Unitarian Meeting House
Bessels Green Baptist Church
The King's Head

Sevenoaks